Christopher J. Yates is a British-American fiction writer and the author of two novels, Black Chalk (2013) and Grist Mill Road (2018). Black Chalk was first published in the UK by Harvill Secker in September 2013 and in the US by Picador in August 2015. In December 2015, NPR named Black Chalk one of the best books of the year. Grist Mill Road received a Kirkus Star  and praise from The New York Times  for a narrative "full of pleasantly unpleasant surprises." He was born in Bromley in London, England on February 4, 1972, and graduated from Wadham College at Oxford University with a law degree in 1993. He currently resides in New York City with his wife.

External links

References 

1972 births
Living people
21st-century British novelists
21st-century American novelists
People from Bromley
Alumni of Wadham College, Oxford
Writers from New York City